The Marco Polo Front (FMP)  was an autonomist and  Venetist political party active in Veneto, named after explorer Marco Polo.

Fabio Padovan, leader of the European Federalist Free Entrepreneurs (LIFE) and former deputy of Liga Veneta–Lega Nord, and Giorgio Vido, another former deputy of LV–LN, formed FMP in 1999 in view of the 2000 regional election. Padovan gained 1.7% of the vote in the election, while FMP stopped at 1.3%. In 2001 the party was merged into Liga Fronte Veneto.

References

Sources
Francesco Jori, Dalla Łiga alla Lega. Storia, movimenti, protagonisti, Marsilio, Venice 2009
Ezio Toffano, Short History of the Venetian Autonomism, Raixe Venete

Political parties in Veneto
Venetian nationalism
Political parties established in 1999
Political parties disestablished in 2001
1999 establishments in Italy
2001 disestablishments in Italy